Varfolomeyevka (also given as Varfolomeyevka South) is an air base in Primorsky Krai, Russia.  During the 1980s it was one of 17 tactical reconnaissance aircraft bases in the Soviet Union, and one of two such bases in the Far East region along with its sister base Vozzhayevka.

The base is home to the 799th Independent Reconnaissance Aviation Squadron flying the Sukhoi Su-24MR (NATO: Fencer).

During the 1960s the primary aircraft assigned were Ilyushin Il-28R (NATO: Beagle).  By 1984 the aircraft had been modernized with 20 to 30 Yakovlev Yak-28R (NATO: Brewer-D/E) and 2 to 16 Mikoyan-Gurevich MiG-21R (NATO: Fishbed-H) reconnaissance jets.  During the 1980s the Soviet Union was replacing these aging aircraft with its third-generation tactical reconnaissance aircraft, the Sukhoi Su-17MR (NATO: Fitter), but it is unknown whether any were assigned to Varfolomeyevka.

In the first decade of the 21st century the airfield hosted regiments of the Russian 11th Air and Air Defence Forces Army.

An unpaved airfield given as Varfolomeyevka Southwest existed 2 km north of Varfolomeyevka South in 1960s Western intelligence documents and was still visible in 1984 Landsat imagery.

References

Soviet Frontal Aviation
Russian Air Force bases